Nicholas Farrar Hughes (January 17, 1962 – March 16, 2009) was an English-American fisheries biologist known as an expert in stream salmonid ecology. Hughes was the son of the American poet Sylvia Plath and English poet Ted Hughes, and the younger brother of artist and poet Frieda Hughes. He and his sister were public figures as small children due to the circumstances of their mother's widely publicized suicide. Hughes held dual British/American citizenship.

Early life
Nicholas was born in North Tawton, Devon, England in 1962. Through his father's mother, Hughes was related to Nicholas Ferrar (1592–1637).

After her son was born, Plath wrote most of the poems that would comprise her most famous collection of poems (the posthumously published Ariel), and published her semi-autobiographical novel about mental illness, The Bell Jar. In the summer of 1962, Ted Hughes began an affair with Assia Wevill; Hughes and Plath separated in the autumn of 1962. On February 11, 1963, while Nicholas, age one, and his sister Frieda, two and a half, slept upstairs, Plath taped shut the doorframe of the room in which the children slept, then placed towels around the kitchen door to make sure fumes could not escape to harm the children, and died by suicide using the toxic gas from the kitchen oven.

Plath addressed one of her last poems, "Nick and the Candlestick", to her son:

O love, how did you get here?
O embryo

Remembering, even in sleep
Your crossed position.
The blood blooms clean

In you, ruby.
The pain
You wake to is not yours.

After their mother Sylvia Plath's 1963 suicide, their father Ted Hughes installed his current lover Assia Wevill in the family home to take care of his & Plath's two children, Frieda & Nicholas.  

In 1969, Assia Wevill also committed suicide after killing her 4-year-old child by Hughes.  

In 1970 Ted Hughes married his long-time lover Carol Orchard, and the children continued their life on the family farm in Devon. 

Despite the posthumous fame of Sylvia Plath, and the growing literary and biographical writings about her death, Nicholas was not told about the circumstances of his mother's suicide until the 1970s. In 1998, Ted Hughes published Birthday Letters, over 30 years of poems about Plath, which he dedicated to his two children.

In the poem "Life After Death", Hughes recounts how:

Your son's eyes.... would become
So perfectly your eyes,
Became wet jewels
The hardest substance of the purest pain
As I fed him in his high white chair.

Professional career
Hughes was passionate about wildlife, especially fish. He attended Oxford University, receiving a BA degree in zoology in 1984. From 1984 to 1991, he worked in Fairbanks, Alaska as a research assistant at the Alaska Cooperative Fish and Wildlife Research Unit, part of the Biological Resources Division of the United States Geological Survey, and from 1990 to 1991, he was a student intern with the Sportfish Division of the Alaska Department of Fish and Game. In 1991, he earned a Ph.D. in biology from University of Alaska Fairbanks (UAF).

After receiving his doctorate, Hughes held  positions of increasing responsibility, instructing at UAF's School of Fisheries and Ocean Sciences in 1991–1992 and working as a research associate with UAF's Institute of Arctic Biology from 1992 to 1998. He held a post-doctoral fellowship from 1993 to 1995 with the Behavioral Ecology Research Group at Simon Fraser University in Burnaby, British Columbia and was a research associate there from 1995 to 1998. In September 1998, he became an assistant professor in the School of Fisheries and Ocean Science at UAF. Hughes studied stream salmonid ecology and conducted research both in the Alaska Interior and in New Zealand. He was a member of the American Fisheries Society.

During his scientific career, Hughes advanced the field of stream ecology as a prominent Alaskan biologist. According to Fairbanks reporter Dermot Cole:

Hughes resigned from his faculty position at UAF in December 2006, but continued his scientific research of king salmon until his death.

Death
On March 16, 2009, Hughes hanged himself in his home in Fairbanks, Alaska. According to his sister Frieda and his UAF colleagues, he had long been battling with depression.

References

External links
New York Times profile
"Hughes-Plath Family Tree" 

1962 births
Alumni of the University of Oxford
English ichthyologists
Suicides by hanging in Alaska
2009 suicides
Sylvia Plath
University of Alaska Fairbanks alumni
University of Alaska Fairbanks faculty
20th-century British zoologists